Meet the Browns is an 2004 American stage play written, produced and directed by Tyler Perry. It stars David & Tamela Mann as Mr. Brown & Cora, as they head off to see Brown's side of the family. The play is a spin off of 2003's Madea's Class Reunion, where it's revealed at the ending that Brown is Cora's long-lost father. The live performance released on VHS and DVD (October 27, 2004) was recorded live in Cleveland at the Palace Theatre on October 7 - 10, 2004.

Plot 
The play begins with Brown's (David Mann) brother, L.B., and his wife, Sarah, in their house very early in the morning. Their daughter, Milay (whose real name is Millie Jean), soon comes in after being awakened at her own house by her parents. She soon learns that her grandfather (Brown and L.B.'s father) had died, and they need help preparing for the funeral. After a little convincing, Milay decides to help with funeral arrangements.

The next morning, Sarah and Milay are talking together while L.B. is upstairs crying. We soon learn that Milay was divorced and had a son who died. But before more can be learned, Mr. Brown and Cora  come in and get acquainted with everyone.  Everyone is surprised to learn that Brown is Cora's father and that Madea is her mother.  Soon after, Will and his wife, Kim, come in.  Will's overly drunk mother, Vera (singer Nicci Gilbert) comes in after them crying hysterically. She jumps upon seeing Brown, believing it was he that had died. When she is told it is her father that has died, she nearly collapses, and begins to cry again. Vera begins to insult Cora about her weight, and Cora starts yelling and pulls out a gun, and begins to act like her mother Madea, very crazy.

Meanwhile, the ladies are at the church when Tracey Stevens walks in. She tells them that she is pregnant and the father is a married man. Sarah gives Tracey her number and address and tells her to stop by any time. Soon only Cora is left in the church when Rev. Henry Oliver walks in. Cora soon takes a liking to the reverend as the two develop a romance.

Later, Tracey comes to the house and goes off with Sarah. Milay's ex-husband, Gerald shows up, giving his sympathy and planning to come to the funeral.  Milay is outraged, mainly because Gerald didn't have the decency to come to their own son's funeral. Once Gerald leaves, Tracey then comes back and sees Will, stating that he is her baby's father. The revelation startles everyone, especially Kim, who storms out in tears.

Sarah, in a musical number, prays to God and hopes her family will be healed. After continuing to angrily reject Will's apologies, Sarah speaks to Kim, who tells her to make a list with every good thing Will had ever done for her along with every bad one. She continues, saying that if the bad outweighed the good, then she was free to let Will go. But if the good were to outweigh the bad, then she should fight completely for her marriage. Later, Tracy reveals that she is not pregnant and reveals her intentions, and Will and Kim finally reconcile. Gerald and Milay also reconcile. In a special feature on the DVD while Brown is teaching the guys how to play golf Madea calls "The Brown's House" looking for Cora and Brown telling them that she is in jail and she will tell them what she did in the next play called Madea Goes to Jail.

Shows

Cast
David Mann as Leroy Brown
Tamela Mann as Cora Jean Simmons 
Tamika Scott as Milay Brown
Kendrick Mays as Larry Brown (L.B.) 
Joyce Williams as Sarah Brown   
Terrell Carter as Will Brown
Demetria McKinney as Kim Brown  
Nicci Gilbert as Vera Brown 
Terrell Phillips as Gerald
Euclid Gray as Rev. Henry Oliver 
Trina Braxton (credited as Trina E. Braxton) as Tracey Stevens

After Milay (Tamika Scott) was fired, Trina Braxton assumed her role.

The Band 

 Mike Frazier - Musical Director / Bass Guitar
 Eric Morgan - Drums
 Donnie "D-Major" Boynton - Keyboards
 Clarence Hill - Keyboards

Musical numbers
All songs written and/or produced by Tyler Perry and Elvin D. Ross.
 "Find A Good Woman (You'll Find a Good Thing") – Will, Brown and L.B.
 "Ain't Nothing Like a Good Man" – Vera, Kim and Tracy
 "Heart to Heart" – Cora
 "Give It to Jesus" – Sarah
 "Don't Give Up on Me" – Will
 "I'll Fly Away" - Sarah and Cora
 "In The Morning (When I Rise)"- L.B., Brown, Henry
 "What Happened to The Man"- Milay and Gerald
 "Silent Night" (ad-lib) - Brown
 "This Is Your Grandaddy" (ad-lib) - Brown
 "Ain't Nothing Like Family" - Sarah, Gerald, Will, Brown, Cora and Company

Film adaptation

A film adaptation of the play was released on March 21, 2008. The film altered almost all the 
plot details found in the play with most of its storyline coming from the 2006 play, What's Done in the Dark.

Differences from the stage play
Despite being the title characters, the Browns are only supporting characters and are only included in the story's subplot. In addition to this, they are only seen near the beginning of the film and near the end.
The only characters that appear in the film are Mr. Brown, Cora, LB, Sarah, Will, and Vera.
LB is more laid-back and friendlier than he is in the play
Mr. Brown is not the central character or protagonist. He is only comic relief.
Madea only appears in the film, as she did not appear in the stage play. (Although she did appear in a flashback in the very beginning & in a recorded phone call towards the middle of the play.)

TV series

The TV series is based on the play and the film of the same name by Tyler Perry. The TV series involves several main characters from the film including, Mr. Brown, Cora Simmons, Will Brown, and features Vera Brown in a recurring role. David Mann, Tamela Mann, Lamman Rucker, and Jenifer Lewis all respectively reprise their characters from the film. L.B. does not make an appearance at any point in the series, although he is mentioned once in an episode of House of Payne.

Trivia
This is the very first Tyler Perry stage play that everyone in the play does a musical number.
Terrell Carter has worked with Tyler Perry in other plays, such as Madea's Class Reunion and What's Done in the Dark.
Demetria McKinney stars in Tyler Perry's House of Payne and Why Did I Get Married?.
David Mann and Tamela Mann, stars in the stage play's television spin-off  Meet the Browns, where Brown opens up his father's home and turn it into a retirement home with Cora, Will and his wife, Sasha (Kim in the play).
David Mann and Tamela Mann, who play father and daughter on stage (Leroy and Cora), are actually husband and wife.

2004 plays
Plays by Tyler Perry
African-American plays
American plays adapted into films
Plays adapted into television shows